Chin Kung AM (淨空; pinyin: Jìngkōng; 15 February 1927 – 26 July 2022) was a Chinese-born Taiwanese Buddhist monk and scholar from the Mahayana tradition. He was the founder of the Corporate Body of the Buddha Educational Foundation, an organization based on the teachings of Pure Land Buddhism. He was known for his teaching of Pure Land Buddhism and work in promoting inter-faith harmony in Australia and the Asia-Pacific region.

Early life
He was born in Lujiang County, Anhui, China as Hsu Yeh-hong (徐業鴻, Xú Yèhóng), and received some classical Confucian education from a tutor in his hometown. At the age of ten, he moved with his family to  Fujian where his father was posted as a chief secretary for the country government. When the Second Sino-Japanese War erupted, Hsu's father joined the National Revolutionary Army. Due to the disruptions of war, which he described as 'unsettling and traumatic', he had to hike with other schoolchildren further inland to Guizhou province in the southwest to avoid battlefront areas. He studied at the National Third Kuichou High School during the Second World War, and then at Nanking First Municipal High School following the war. His formal secular education ended in 1947, when his father died, depriving the family of their only breadwinner. 

In 1949, after the communist victory in the Chinese Civil War, he moved to Taiwan and spent thirteen years as a clerk at the Shihchien Institute, a training institution for military officers, studying Buddhism and Philosophy in his spare time under the guidance of Professor Fang Tung-mei, Changkya Khutukhtu (章嘉呼圖克圖 a master in Mongolian Buddhism), and lay teacher Lee Ping-nan. He entered the monastic life in 1959, and was ordained at Lintzi Temple at Yuanshan in Taipei, Taiwan. It was then that he received the dharma name of Chin Kung, meaning "pure emptiness". He started studying under Lee Ping-nan in Taizhong in 1958 and trained under him for ten years. At the time, there was an oversupply of monks in Taipei, due to an influx of refugees from mainland China, and there was not enough positions in temples for them. Furthermore, associates of Lee were viewed unfavourably by the establishment, as lay dharma teacher Lee was frowned upon for intruding into what was seen as the domain of ordained monks.

Establishment 
Chin Kung was unsuccessful in finding a temple in Taipei, so in 1966, he accepted the offer of lay supporter Han Ying, and moved into her family home for 17 years. Han helped Chin Kung by renting venues for him to give dharma talks, and he also travelled to the south of the island to give teachings, including at Buddhist institutions run by Hsing Yun. Chin Kung also taught at the Chinese Culture University from 1975 to 1980. In 1979, with the help of Han, Chin Kung set up the Hwa Dzan Buddhist Library in Taipei, allowing him a stable physical base for his activities. From the late 1970s on, Chin Kung's international profile increased, and he received requests to travel to Singapore, Hong Kong, the US and Malaysia among other places to give Buddhist teachings, and in the process, set up like-minded local Buddhist groups. In 1997, after Han's death, he relocated his base to Singapore, where he was patronised by businessman and lay Buddhist organiser Li Muyuan, before relocating to Australia in 2002.

Teaching and writing 

Chin Kung became well known for using modern technology to spread the Buddha's teachings. Starting in the 1970s, his lectures were recorded on audio, videotapes, and then later on CDs and DVDs and the internet for wide distribution in many temples, where they can be freely passed on, at a time when Buddhist teachings were not readily available in electronic formats. In 2003, a lay disciple named Chen Caiqiong founded Hwazan TV, a cable channel that broadcasts Chin Kung's teachings 24 hours a day, seven days a week. 

He is known for in-depth exposition series on many core Mahayana texts, such as the Avatamsaka Sutra (Flower Adornment Sutra), Surangama Sutra, Lotus Sutra (Dharma Flower Sutra), Diamond Sutra, Platform Sutra (Sutra of the Sixth Patriarch Huineng), and Infinite Life Sutra. Since the 1960s, he has been known for his attention to detail in delivering his teachings, rather than building temples. Even in his late 80s, was giving dharma talks for four hours a day. His teaching style comprised focusing on one sutra at a time, and explaining it verse by verse, covering a few passages in each lecture, meaning that a complete lecture series on any given sutra can take several months or more than a year. According to Chinese Buddhism researcher Sun Yafei, Chin Kung has "an exceptional ability to communicate doctrinal points [in] language comprehensible even to people with little education" and credits his "skillful use of ... life experience ... to hold the attention of the audience, and lends his messages persuasive power." 

Chin Kung was also known to study the teachings of other philosophical and religious traditions, and was known for emphasising the philosophy of "kindness, fraternity, sincerity, and humility". Since the late 1990s, Chin Kung organised and participated in interfaith forums across the globe, emphasising the importance of education and exhorting religious teachers to set an example by practicing the teachings of the sages and saints in their daily lives, and humbly learning from other religions.

Chin Kung founded and led the Hwa Dzan Society of Propagating Teachings, Hwa Dzan Monastery, Hwa Dzan Buddhist Library, Hwa Dzan Lecture Hall, and The Corporate Body of the Buddha Educational Foundation (1984). He sponsored the printing and the distribution of Buddhist texts worldwide, as well as portraits and pictures of various Buddhas and Bodhisattvas, free of charge. As of 2005, he had organised the printing and dissemination of over three million texts and more than a million portraits of Buddhist figures. In his later years, Chin Kung emphasized the Infinite Life Sutra and the Pure Land cultivation method of Buddha recitation, mainly featuring the recitation of Amitābha Buddha's name.

Partly due to his use of technology, he was widely recognised in his adopted homeland of Taiwan and was a frequent presence on television stations such as Hwadzan Television.

He resided in Australia for many years and was based in the regional city of Toowoomba, near the Queensland state capital of Brisbane. In 2001, he established the present form of the Pure Land Learning College Association (originally formed in Taiwan in 1984) in Toowoomba, Australia, to further propagate Buddhism and train Buddhist monks and nuns, and had started (as of 2005) 15 Pure Land Learning Centres across the world. He supported the Buddhist Educational Foundation at the University of Sydney and sponsored the Institution for Peace and Conflict Resolution at the University of Queensland. He also travelled many times to Hong Kong, Singapore, mainland China, to teach Mahayana Buddhism.

In 2016, he worked with the British government and the University of Wales Trinity Saint David to promote study in Sinology in order to revitalize the teaching of the ancient sages of China.

Achievements

In 2002, Chin Kung he was awarded an honorary professorship from the University of Queensland and an honorary doctorate from Griffith University, both in Brisbane, Australia. In December 2003, he was appointed the Honorary Founding Patron of the Australian Centre for Peace and Conflict Studies at the University of Queensland. In April 2004, he was awarded an honorary doctorate by the University of Southern Queensland. In June 2004, he was awarded an honorary doctorate of Syarif Hidayatullan State Islamic University, Jakarta, in Indonesia.

In June 2005, the Most Venerable Chin Kung was appointed a Member of the Order of Australia in the General Division. He was recognised for "service to the Buddhist community in Queensland, particularly through the promotion of Buddhism and the fostering of interfaith activities between diverse ethnic groups, and to the community through support for educational and health institutions".

In September 2017, the "Association of Chin Kung's Friends at UNESCO" was established at the UNESCO Headquarters in Paris, aiming to "promote religious unity, restore religious education, and promote traditional culture".

Understanding of Buddhism
Chin Kung categorized Buddhism in practice into four different types. First, traditional Buddhism, the teachings of Buddha Shakyamuni, which is very rare in our days. Second, religious Buddhism, which does not represent the real Buddhism but has become recognized by the society, as temples nowadays no longer practice intense teachings and meditation as they once did. Third, academic Buddhist studies as taught in many universities today, where Buddhism is treated purely as a philosophy. This is not comprehensive as the dharma covers everything essential to human beings. Finally, the total degeneration of Buddhism into a cult, which came into being in the late 20th century, and does great harm to society. Chin Kung tried to correct these misunderstandings and lead the public back to the original form of Buddhism as taught by Sakyamuni Buddha.

Death 
After 62 years of expounding Buddhism, Chin Kung retired from teaching in 2021 and resigned from all of his positions in April 2022. He died at the age of 95 on 26 July 2022 in Tainan, Taiwan.

Books 
Chin Kung has authored the following books

 The Art of Living
 Buddhism as an Education
 Buddhism: The Awakening of Compassion and Wisdom
 The Collected Works of Chin Kung
 Path to True Happiness
 To Understand Buddhism

References

General and cited references

Footnotes

External links
 
 Official site of the Amitabha Buddhist Society
 Biography of Ven. Chin Kung
 Journey to Peace
 Collected talks of Chin Kung
 净空法师文集

1927 births
2022 deaths 
Pure Land Buddhists
Chinese religious leaders
Chinese scholars of Buddhism
Taiwanese Buddhist monks
Taiwanese emigrants to Australia
Taiwanese religious leaders
Members of the Order of Australia
People from Hefei
Taiwanese people from Anhui